Arnoglossum atriplicifolium, the pale Indian plantain, is a perennial herbaceous wildflower in the sunflower family (Asteraceae). native to the central and eastern United States.

Description
The stems and lower surface of the leaves have a grayish white color, which is the source of the "pale" in the common name and is a distinguishing feature when differentiating it from other species in the Arnoglossum genus. 

At the top of the central stalk is a flat-topped corymb, or cluster, of 4 to 15 flower heads. Flower heads are white, sometimes with a bit of green or purple, with disc florets but no ray florets. The plant spreads by means of underground rhizomes.

Distribution and habitat
It is widely distributed through the central and eastern states of the United States from the  Atlantic Coast westward as far as Kansas, but it is listed as endangered in the state of New Jersey. It grows in pastures, roadsides, and edges of woods.

Ecology
Flowers bloom July to November. The plant is pollinated by insects, primarily wasps, including sand wasps (Bicyrtes), great black wasps (Sphex pensylvanicus), great golden digger wasps (Sphex ichneumoneus), and thread-waisted wasps, ( Ammophila spp.) flies, and small bees.

References

External links
Illinois Wildflowers
Lady Bird Johnson Wildflower Center, University of Texas
Plants of the Eloise Butler Wildflower Garden 
Delaware wildflowers
Michigan flora
Digital Atlas of Virginia Flora

Senecioneae
Flora of the United States
Plants described in 1753
Taxa named by Carl Linnaeus